Steve Schapiro (November 16, 1934 – January 15, 2022) was an American photographer. He is known for his photographs of key moments of the civil rights movement such as the March on Washington for Jobs and Freedom or the Selma to Montgomery marches. He is also known for his portraits of celebrities and movie stills, most importantly from The Godfather (1972) and Taxi Driver (1976).

Life and career
Schapiro was born on November 16, 1934 in Brooklyn to David Schapiro, a stationery store owner in Rockefeller Center and Esther (Sperling) Schapiro who worked at her husband's stationery store. He discovered photography at the age of nine. Soon he decided to devote himself to photojournalism. One of his role models at the time was the French photographer Henri Cartier-Bresson.

Schapiro took lessons with W. Eugene Smith, an influential photographer during the Second World War. Smith taught him the technical skills and showed him how to develop his own views of the world and of photography. Schapiro's work reflects the influence of his teacher.

In 1961 Schapiro began working as a freelance photographer. His photos were published in Life, Vanity Fair, Sports Illustrated, Newsweek, Time and Paris Match.

The political, cultural and social changes of the 1960s in the United States were an inspiration for Schapiro. He accompanied Robert F. Kennedy during his presidential campaign and captured key moments of the civil rights movement such as the March on Washington for Jobs and Freedom or the Selma to Montgomery marches. Schapiro not only worked in the fields of photojournalism and documentation, but also became a real activist. This is, for instance, visible in his way of documenting the hard lives of immigrant workers from Arkansas he dealt with in 1961.

In the 1970s, Schapiro focused more on film set photography. Having taken photos of Midnight Cowboy (1969), among them also a famous one of Dustin Hoffman, he was hired as a photographer by Paramount Pictures. He photographed on the set of The Godfather (1972) by Francis Ford Coppola with a cast including Marlon Brando, Al Pacino, James Caan and Robert Duvall. One of his photographs is of "Marlon Brando and the Cat". Schapiro was also present at the film set of Chinatown (1974) by Roman Polanski. Two years later, Schapiro was – by request of Robert De Niro – hired as a photographer on the set of Martin Scorsese's movie Taxi Driver (1976).

Schapiro captured key moments of modern American history with his photos that also reflect his own social and human awareness.

He died from pancreatic cancer at his home in Chicago, on January 15, 2022, at the age of 87.

Publications
 Steve Schapiro: American Edge. Arena, 2000.
 Schapiro's Heroes. powerHouse, 2007.
 The Godfather Family Album. Paul Duncan (ed.). Taschen, 2010.
 Steve Schapiro: Then and Now. Lonnie Ali, Matthias Harder. Hatje Cantz, 2012.
 Taxi Driver. Paul Duncan (ed.), Taschen, 2013.
 Barbra Streisand by Steve Schapiro and Lawrence Schiller. Schapiro, Lawrence Schiller, Patt Morrison, Lawrence Grobel, Nina Wiener (eds.). Taschen, 2014.
 Bliss: Transformational Festivals & the Neo Hippie. powerHouse, 2015.
 Misericordia: Together We Celebrate. powerHouse, 2016.
 Bowie. powerHouse, 2016.
 The Fire Next Time. James Baldwin and Steve Schapiro. Taschen, 2017.
 Ali. powerHouse, 2018.

References

External links

1934 births
2022 deaths
American photojournalists
Journalists from New York City
Photographers from New York City
Writers from Brooklyn
Deaths from cancer in Illinois
Deaths from pancreatic cancer